Sant Joan de Vinyafrescal is a village located in the municipality of La Pobla de Segur, in Province of Lleida province, Catalonia, Spain. As of 2020, it has a population of 68.

Geography 
Sant Joan de Vinyafrescal is located 102km north-northeast of Lleida.

References

Populated places in the Province of Lleida